Sézary disease, or Sézary syndrome, is a type of cutaneous T-cell lymphoma that was first described by Albert Sézary. The affected T cells, known as Sézary's cells or Lutzner cells, have pathological quantities of mucopolysaccharides. Sézary disease is sometimes considered a late stage of mycosis fungoides with lymphadenopathy.

Signs and symptoms

Sézary disease and mycosis fungoides are cutaneous T-cell lymphomas having a primary manifestation in the skin. The disease's origin is a peripheral CD4+ T-lymphocyte, although rarer CD8+/CD4- cases have been observed. Epidermotropism (lymphocytes residing in the epidermis)  by neoplastic CD4+ lymphocytes with the formation of Pautrier's microabscesses is the hallmark sign of the disease. Although the condition can affect people of all ages, it is commonly diagnosed in adults over age 60. The dominant signs and symptoms of the disease are:

 Generalized erythroderma– redness of the skin
 Lymphadenopathy – swollen, enlarged lymph nodes
 Atypical T cells – malignant lymphocytes known as "Sézary cells" seen in the peripheral blood with typical cerebriform nuclei (brain-shaped, convoluted nuclei)
 Hepatosplenomegaly– enlarged liver and spleen
 Palmoplantar keratoderma – thickening of the palms of the hands, and soles of the feet

Diagnosis

Those who have Sézary disease often present with skin lesions that do not heal with normal medication. A blood test generally reveals any change in the levels of lymphocytes in the blood, which is often associated with a cutaneous T-cell lymphoma. Finally, a biopsy of a skin lesion can be performed to rule out any other causes.

The immunohistochemical features are very similar to those presented in mycosis fungoides except for the following differences:
 More monotonous cellular infiltrates (large, clustered atypical pagetoid cells) in Sézary syndrome
 Sometimes absent epidermotropism
 Increased lymph node involvement with infiltrates of Sézary syndrome.

Treatment
Treatment typically includes some combination of photodynamic therapy, radiation therapy, chemotherapy, and biologic therapy.

Treatments are often used in combination with phototherapy and chemotherapy, though pure chemotherapy is rarely used today. No single treatment type has revealed clear-cut benefits in comparison to others, treatment for all cases remains problematic.

Radiation therapy
A number of types of radiation therapy may be used including total skin electron therapy. While this therapy does not generally result in systemic toxic effects it can produce side effects involving the skin. It is only available at a few institutions.

Chemotherapy
Romidepsin, vorinostat and a few others are a second-line drug for cutaneous T-cell lymphoma. Mogamulizumab has been approved in Japan and the United States.

Epidemiology
In the Western population, there are around 3 cases of Sézary syndrome per 1,000,000 people. Sézary disease is more common in males with a ratio of 2:1, and the mean age of diagnosis is between 55 and 60 years of age.

See also 
 List of cutaneous conditions

References

External links 

 Sezary Syndrome lymphoma information

Lymphoma
Lymphoid-related cutaneous conditions
Syndromes